Forte Monte Mario is one of the 15 forts of Rome, built between  1877 and 1891.
It is located in Rome (Italy), in the Quarter Q. XV Della Vittoria, within the Municipio I.

History 
Construction was started in 1877 and was finished in 1882.

It is currently occupied by military units.

Biography

External links 
 
 

Forts in Italy